Sir Frederick Ernest Gibberd  (7 January 1908 – 9 January 1984) was an English architect, town planner and landscape designer. He is particularly known for his work in Harlow, Essex, and for the BISF house, a design for a prefabricated council house that was widely adopted in post-war Britain.

Biography
Gibberd was born in Coventry, the eldest of the five children of a local tailor, and was educated at the city's King Henry VIII School. In 1925 he was articled to a firm of architects in Birmingham and studied architecture under William Bidlake at the Birmingham School of Art, where his roommate was F. R. S. Yorke.

A good friend of Sir Geoffrey Jellicoe, Gibberd's work was influenced by Le Corbusier, Mies van der Rohe, and F. R. S. Yorke. He set up in practice in 1930, designing Pullman Court, Streatham Hill, London (1934–36), a housing development which launched his career. With the success of this scheme, Gibberd became established as the 'flat' architect and went on to build several other schemes including Park Court, Sydenham, London (1936) and Ellington Court, Southgate, London (1936) continuing to practise until the outbreak of the Second World War.

Gibberd and Yorke collaborated on a number of publications including the influential book The Modern Flat, which was published in 1937 and featured the then newly completed Pullman Court and Park Court, as well as many other European examples. He also designed the BISF house, a prefabricated form of council housing sponsored by the British Iron and Steel Federation and widely adopted by local authorities in Britain in the post-war period.

He was consultant architect planner for the Harlow development and spent the rest of his life living in the town he had designed. His most notable works here include The Lawn, Britain's first modern-style point block, consisting of nine storeys arranged in a butterfly design on an area of open ground surrounded by oak trees; a trompe-l'oeil pair of curved terraces facing a cricket green at Orchard Croft, which won a British Housing Award in 1951; the pioneering broken-silhouette flats in Morley Grove; and much of the housing in Mark Hall neighbourhood, which is in its entirety a conservation area. The Harvey Centre lacks architectural distinction, but is notable as an early British example of a large purpose-built indoor shopping mall. His similarly pioneering Sports Centre has been demolished, as has the original town hall. The Water Gardens, although listed by English Heritage, have been spoilt by the abutment of a car park and shopping centre. The garden of his personal home at Marsh Lane (Gibberd Garden), on the outskirts of Harlow, a mixture of formal and informal design, contains architectural elements salvaged from his reconstruction of Coutts Bank in London.

A further achievement by Gibberd in planning Harlow is his incorporation of works by many leading architects of the post-war years, such as FRS Yorke, Powell & Moya, Graham Dawbarn, John Poulson, Maxwell Fry & Jane Drew, Michael Neylan, William Crabtree, Leonard Manasseh, ECP Monson, Gerard Goalen, Gerald Lacoste, Richard Sheppard and H. T. Cadbury-Brown. A substantial collection of public sculptures is visible around the town, including works by Henry Moore, Elisabeth Frink, Auguste Rodin and Barbara Hepworth.

Gibberd wrote Harlow: The story of a New Town in collaboration with Len White and Ben Hyde Harvey. In 1953 he published Town Design a book on the forms, processes, and history of the subject.

His architectural firm, Frederick Gibberd Partnership, continues to practise in London.

Personal life 
He married first Dorothy Phillips, with whom he had one son and two daughters. She died in 1970. He then married Mrs Patricia Fox-Edwards on 30 March 1972. They remained married until his death. 

Gibberd was made a CBE in 1954 and knighted in 1967.

Notable buildings

Harlow New Town
London Central Mosque
Liverpool Metropolitan Cathedral
Didcot Power Station, Oxfordshire, England

A list of buildings by Frederick Gibberd

1933–1936, Pullman Court, Streatham, London
1936, Park Court, Sydenham, London 
1937, Ellington Court, Southgate, London
1937–1939, Macclesfield Nurses Home, Cheshire, England
1945–1949, Somerford Estate, Hackney, London
1946–1963, Nuneaton Town Centre, Warwickshire, England
1949–1951, Chrisp Street Market and associated housing, Poplar, London (part of the Lansbury Estate)
1950 Orchard Croft Housing Estate & The Stow (Shopping centre), Harlow, Essex, England
1950–1969, Terminal Buildings, Heathrow Airport, near London (including the old Terminal 1, Terminal 2, and Queens Building)
1951, The Lawn, Harlow, Essex, England
1952, Market Square, Harlow, Essex, England
1953–1961, Ulster Hospital, Belfast
1956, Bath Technical College, Somerset, England
1956–1968, Civic Centre, Saint Albans, Hertfordshire, England
1958, Derwent Reservoir, Durham and Northumberland, England
1958, The Beckers, Rectory Road, Hackney, London
1958–1961, Kingsgate Estate, Hackney, London
1959–1969, Civic Centre, Doncaster, Yorkshire, England
1962, College of Technology, Kingston-Upon-Hull, England
1962, Sydenham, Leamington Spa
1959–1968, Fulwell Cross Library, Ilford
1960–1966, Priory Square, Birmingham, England 
1960–1967, Roman Catholic Cathedral, Liverpool, England
1961, Morley Grove Flats, Harlow, Essex, England
1962–1966, Douai Abbey, Berkshire, England
1964, Saint George's Chapel, Heathrow Airport, near London
1964, Water Gardens, Harlow, Essex, England
1965, Chapel, De La Salle College, Middleton, Lancashire, England
1964–1968, Didcot Power Station, Oxfordshire, England
1965–1974, Edmonton Green, Edmonton, London
1966–1975, Arundel Great Court, The Strand, London
1968–1975, Inter-Continental Hotel, Hyde Park Corner, London
1969, Coutts Bank Headquarters, The Strand, London
1970-1975, 10 Spring Gardens, British Council headquarters
1970–1977, London Central Mosque
1972, Royal Spa Centre, Leamington Spa

1973, Homer House, Monson Street, Lincoln, England. Described by Pevsner as Two staggered wings of offices either side of a service block. Red brick with an emphatic chamfering of angles and a strong vertical accent of load-bearing buttress piers dividing the main elevations into seven and eight bays. The overall impact is of somewhat fortress-like austerity.
1973-1974. Thomas Cooper Memorial Chapel, High Street, Lincoln, England.
1980, The Harvey Centre, Harlow, Essex, England

Selected publications
The Architecture of England: from Norman Times to the Present Day. Architectural Press. 1938
Built in Furniture in Great Britain. Alec Tiranti, 1948.
Harlow: The story of a New Town (With Len White and Ben Hyde Harvey). 1980.
Town Design a book on the forms, processes, and history of the subject. 1953.

References

External links
Frederick Gibberd bio 
 The Gibberd Garden, Harlow
 Profile on Royal Academy of Arts Collections

1908 births
1984 deaths
People from Coventry
Architects from Warwickshire
Knights Bachelor
People educated at King Henry VIII School, Coventry
20th-century English architects
Royal Academicians
Alumni of the Birmingham School of Art
Liturgists
English ecclesiastical architects
Architects of the Liturgical Movement